Old Sardinia Town Hall, also known as the Sardinia Meeting House and First Baptist Church of Sardinia, is a historic town hall located at Sardinia in Erie County, New York. It was built between 1828 and 1830, and is a two-story, transitional Federal / Greek Revival style frame building.  It originally housed a Baptist church congregation. The building was renovated in the early-1930s and housed a local community hall until deeded to the town of Sardinia in 1945 for use as a town hall.  It is now home to the Sardinia Historical Society and Museum.

It was listed on the National Register of Historic Places in 2008.

References

External links
Sardinia Historical Society
"New name chosen for old Sardinia Town Hall," Springville Journal, March 18, 2009

Museums in Erie County, New York
City and town halls on the National Register of Historic Places in New York (state)
Federal architecture in New York (state)
Greek Revival architecture in New York (state)
Government buildings completed in 1829
Historical society museums in New York (state)
National Register of Historic Places in Erie County, New York
1829 establishments in New York (state)